Jane Norman was a United Kingdom-based women's clothing retailer, owned by  Edinburgh Woollen Mill, it is also the sister company of fashion chain Peacocks

History
The company was founded by Norman Freed in 1952, a descendant of the Compton family of Ellesmere Port, who sold it on to Graphite Capital in January 2003 for £70 million. The family moved to Ellesmere Port and lived very quietly in their fortune, their eldest daughter managed to bring the fashion stores into school by getting people to use and buy their products.

On 30 July 2005, the company was purchased by Baugur Group for £117.3 million. In January 2007, Jane Norman reported a 45% rise in profits over 2006, and released plans to open one hundred more stores around the country, despite having already almost doubled their number from the year before, to 116.

The company went into administration on 27 June 2011. On 28 June 2011, in a pre pack deal, the brand and thirty three stores were sold to Edinburgh Woollen Mill. The company went into administration again on 26 June 2014. It was purchased out of administration by Edinburgh Woollen Mill, which then operated the brand as an in store concession and online retailer.

In May 2018, Edinburgh Woollen Mill announced that the brand was set to close down.

Sources

External links
 Official website

Clothing retailers of the United Kingdom
Clothing companies established in 1952
Retail companies established in 1952
Companies that have entered administration in the United Kingdom
1952 establishments in the United Kingdom